The House of Dora Green is a 1933 German thriller film directed by Henrik Galeen and starring Mady Christians, Paul Hartmann, and Leonard Steckel. It was based on the novel Diplomatische Unterwelt by Hans Rudolf Berndorff. It was the final German film made by Galeen, before being forced into exile following the Nazi Party's takeover of power. In 1937 it was released in the United States.

Synopsis
Foreign spies wishing to steal a technological breakthrough enlist the unwitting assistance of a cabaret singer, Dora Green. After she discovers their true intentions, she helps the authorities thwart their scheme.

Cast

References

Bibliography

External links

1933 films
Films of the Weimar Republic
1930s spy thriller films
German spy thriller films
1930s German-language films
Films directed by Henrik Galeen
Films based on German novels
German black-and-white films
1930s German films